Bryn  Apprill  (born January 29, 1996) is an American voice actress affiliated with Funimation. Her voice acting career began when she was a high school student in 2013, and since then, she has been providing voices for a number of English-language versions of Japanese anime films and television series. She is often typecast as shy young girls due to her airy high-pitched voice. Some of her major roles include Krista Lenz / Historia Reiss in Attack on Titan, Kurumi in Hal, Kurumi Narumi in Mikagura School Suite, Kaede in The Boy and the Beast, Awaki Musujime in A Certain Magical Index, Himeko Momokino in Citrus, Hiyori Iki in Noragami, Kobeni Higashiyama in Chainsaw Man, Hikari Takanashi in Interviews with Monster Girls, Roka Shibasaki in D-Frag!, Sumireko Hanabusa in Riddle Story of Devil, Izumiko Suzuhara in Red Data Girl, Kotori Itsuka in Date A Live, Akane Sakurada in Castle Town Dandelion, Haruna in Kancolle: Kantai Collection, San Diego in Azur Lane, Honoka Tamarai in ReLIFE, Miku in Darling in the Franxx, Haruna Sairenji in the To Love Ru series, Yaya in Unbreakable Machine-Doll, Chocola in Nekopara, Mimosa Vermillion in Black Clover, and Cyan Hijirikawa in Show by Rock!!.

Filmography

Anime

Films

Video games

References

External links
 
 
 
  

1996 births
Living people
American stage actresses
American video game actresses
American voice actresses
People from Plano, Texas
21st-century American actresses